The term punch refers to a wide assortment of drinks, both non-alcoholic and alcoholic, generally containing fruits or fruit juice. The drink was introduced from the Indian subcontinent to England by employees of the East India Company in the late 17th century. Punch is usually served at parties in large, wide bowls, known as punch bowls.

In the United States, federal regulations provide the word "punch" to describe commercial beverage products that do not contain fruit or fruit juice.  The term is used to label artificially flavored beverages, with or without natural flavorings, which do not contain fruit juice or concentrate in significant proportions. Thus a product labeled as "fruit punch" may contain no fruit ingredients at all.

History 
The original drink in the Indian subcontinent was named paantsch. The word punch may be a loanword from Hindi पाँच (pāñć), meaning "five", as the drink was frequently made with five ingredients: alcohol, sugar, juice from either a lime or a lemon, water,  and spices. Some believe the word originates from the English puncheon, which was a volumetric description for certain sized barrels used to transport alcohol on ships.

The drink was introduced from the Indian subcontinent to England by employees of the East India Company in the late 17th century. From there it was introduced into other European countries. When served communally, the drink is expected to be of a lower alcohol content than a typical cocktail.

The term punch was first recorded in English documents in 1632. At the time, most punches were of the wassail type made with a wine or brandy base. But around 1655, Jamaican-produced rum came into use, and the "modern" punch emerged. By 1671, documents make references to punch houses.

As the need for a single-serving punch became evident, the sling, composed of spirits, water, and a sweetener, was invented.

Variations

Non-alcoholic 

Non-alcoholic varieties, which are especially given to children as well as adults who do not drink alcohol, typically include a mix of fruit juice, water, and a sweetener such as sugar or honey. Lemon-lime soda, ginger ale, or other fruit-flavored carbonated sodas are often added.  It also often contains slices or chunks of actual fruit such as oranges and pineapple. The non-alcoholic versions are typically served at school dances, church functions, picnics, and other similar social occasions.

Commercial manufacturers distribute many types of "fruit punch" beverages. These are usually colored red. Despite the name, most brands contain only a small fraction of actual fruit juice; the major constituents are typically sugar or corn syrup, citric acid, and artificial flavors. They may also be carbonated or nonalcoholic cocktail mixers. Hawaiian Punch, Hi-C and Minute Maid are three of the better-known brands in the US. Other related drinks include Kool-Aid powdered drink mix, fassionola, and Tiki Punch (a carbonated soft drink from Shasta).

Alcoholic 

Historically, most spirit based early alcoholic punches were made using either arrack or rum. Bajan (Barbadian) rum punch is one of the oldest rum punches and has a simple recipe enshrined in a national rhyme: "One of Sour, Two of Sweet, Three of Strong, Four of Weak." That is: one part lime juice, two parts sweetener, three parts rum (preferably Barbados), and four parts water. It is served with a dash or two of Angostura bitters and nutmeg.

There are many rum-based punches, including Planter's Punch, Fish House Punch, Caribbean Rum Punch, and others. Arrack based punches were included in Jacob Grohusko's 1910 and Charles Mahoney's 1912 bartenders guides, and an early recipe for arrack punch was written by Pehr Osbeck, Olof Torén, and Carl Gustaf Ekeberg in their 1771 book, A Voyage to China and the East Indies: 

Alcoholic punches are common among parties for college and university students. These punches tend to be highly alcoholic and made with cheap ingredients. They may be referred to by names such as "grain punch" (made with high-proof grain alcohol and sundry mixers) or "Jungle Juice" (liquor of various sorts brought to a BYOB party, mixed in a lined trash can with various carbonated beverages, kool-aid, or whatever is on hand). Some exclude additional water altogether and have 30% alcohol by volume (ABV) or more.

Punches around the world

Australia 
Blow My Skull is a famous alcoholic punch drink that originated in mid-19th-century Australia that contains rum, porter, lime, sugar, and other ingredients.

Barbados 
Bajan Punch is made with rum, lime juice, cane sugar, nutmeg, and bitters. Falernum liqueur is also frequently added, which was itself an early form of punch made by steeping cloves with rum, lime, and other ingredients.

Caribbean 
Ti' Punch, literally meaning "small punch", is a rum-based punch that is especially popular in Martinique and other French-speaking islands of Caribbean. The drink is traditionally made with white rhum agricole, lime, and cane syrup.

England 
Cups is a style of punch, traditionally served before the departure of a hunting party in England. It is served at a variety of social events such as garden parties, cricket and tennis matches, and picnics. Cups are generally lower in alcohol content than other punches and usually use wine, cider, sloe gin, or liqueurs as the base. They often include quantities of fruit juices or soft drinks.

A well-known cup is the Pimm's Cup, using Pimm's No.1 (which contains gin) and British-style lemonade at a ratio of 1:2; a squeeze of lemon; then add orange, lemon and apple slices; a couple of cucumber wedges; and decorate with borage flowers.

Germany 

Punch (Punsch in German) refers to a mixture of several fruit juices and spices, often with wine or liquor added and mostly topped with champagne or sparkling wine. Punch is popular in Germany and with many Germans who emigrated to America. Parties on New Year's Eve ("Silvester") often include a Feuerzangenbowle ("burnt punch" or, literally, "fire tongs punch"). This is a punch made of red wine and flaming overproof rum (such as Stroh), poured over a Zuckerhut (sugarloaf), a large conical sugar cube placed in the "Feuerzange". It's similar to mulled wine ("Glühwein"). Another warm punch, popular with hunters or others spending time in the cold, is jagertee punch.

Indian subcontinent 
Arrack-based punches were historically popular in India and Sri Lanka, where it was distilled from toddy, the wine made from sap of various palm trees.

Korea 
Hwachae is a term for traditional Korean punches. Sujeonggwa is a traditional punch made from dried persimmons, cinnamon, and ginger.

Mexico 

Ponche is served during the Christmas holiday season. It is served warm. Some ingredients used to make ponche are more seasonal and even exotic. Fresh tejocotes, known to the Aztecs as Texocotli (stone fruit) are required by most. Tejocotes are the fruit of the hawthorn tree and resemble crab apples; they have a sweet-sour flavor and an orange to golden yellow color. Other ingredients in ponche are prunes, pears, dry hibiscus, star anise, and sugar cane pieces.

Argentina 
In Argentina and Uruguay, Claret Cup has been introduced by British immigrants and was widely adopted by the population. Known as Clericó, its Spanishized form, it is the traditional Christmas and New Year punch, which occur in the summer of the Southern Hemisphere. It is made with red wine and fruits such as oranges, apples, peaches, strawberries, etc. Other alcoholic beverages are commonly added in combination. In Argentina it is generally served from a punch bowl (ponchera).

Due to its proximity to Argentina, Paraguay has also adopted Clericó (and with the same Spanishized name) and it is also consumed during Christmas and New Year celebrations there. In Paraguay, it is tipycally served from a clay pot called kambuchi.

Sweden 
"Punch" is typically called bål in Sweden, and is commonly served in a bowl at social functions (e.g. graduation or wedding receptions). Bål as thought of broadly should not to be confused with punsch, which is a specific type of alcoholic punch using arrack that was very popular in Sweden in the decades around 1900. Due to its popularity the arrack punch saw commercial bottling in 1845, and became known more broadly outside Scandinavia as the liqueur Swedish punsch.

Dragoon punch was popular in Sweden and Norway in the early 1900s, and added both stout and beer to brandy, champagne, and sherry.

United States 
Some claim Planter's Punch was invented at the bar of the Planters' House hotel in St. Louis, Missouri. The recipe of Planter's Punch varies, containing some combination of rum, lemon juice, pineapple juice, lime juice, orange juice, grenadine, soda water, curaçao, Angostura bitters, and cayenne pepper. The first known print reference to Planter's Punch was in the August 8, 1908 edition of The New York Times:

This recipe I give to thee,
dear brother in the heat.
Take two of sour (lime let it be)
To one and a half of sweet,
of Old Jamaica pour three strong,
and add four parts of weak.
Then mix and drink. I do no wrong —
I know whereof I speak.

Southern bourbon punch is a drink closely associated with Kentucky and other Southern states. Sweet bourbon punch is made with sweet tea (a signature drink of the South), citrus flavors and bourbon whiskey. Bourbon is named for Bourbon County, Kentucky, and each year during the Kentucky Derby, recipes for bourbon punch abound.

See also
 
 
 List of cocktails
 List of cocktails (alphabetical)
 Fruit cocktail
 Fruit cup
 Jungle juice
 Kompot
 Mojito is rum punch with added mint
 Non-alcoholic mixed drink
 Poncha is a traditional alcoholic drink from the island of Madeira
 Shrub (drink)

References

Sources

Mixed drinks